Priyamana Thozhi (transl. Lovable Friend) is an 2022 Indian Tamil-language family drama series starring Sandra Babu and Vicky Roshan. It premiered on Sun TV on 30 May 2022 available for worldwide streaming on Sun NXT.

Plot
The story involves Pavithra (Sandra Babu) and Adithya (Vicky Roshan) enjoy life with their unique and inseparable bond of friendship. Pavithra falls in love and marries Aravind, Adithya's older brother, while Adithya is engaged to Sanghavi, his childhood friend. About a month after Pavithra and Aravind's wedding, Aravind dies from falling off of a building. At the viewing, everyone finds out Pavithra is pregnant. Sanghavi doesn't like how Adithya is really close to Pavithra after Aravind's death. Seeta arranges a marriage between Pavithra and Deva. Deva is a murderer who is still in trial for the case but no one is aware of that. No one knows about this arrangement and Aditya is suspicious about Deva. Sanghavi is adamant about ending the friendship between Pavithra and Adithya and she is trying to make Pavithra not attend their wedding and move out before the wedding. Will Adithya and Sanghavi's wedding happen? Will Pavithra move out? Will Pavithra get married to Deva? What happens when life throws exciting changes and distressing obstacles in their way? Will friendships and relationships survive life's transitions and social challenges?

Cast

Main
 Sandra Babu as Pavithra Aravind, Aravind's Wife 
 Vicky Roshan as Adithyakumar Damodharan, Sanghavi's love interest and friend
 Deepthi Rajendran as Sanghavi,  Adithya's love lnterest and childhood friend

Supporting 
 Kaushik Gabriel as Aravindkumar Damodharan, Pavithra's late husband and Adithya's elder brother (deceased)
 Vanaja Bharath Kumar as Seetha, Adithya, Aravind, and Keerthi's aunt   
 Anjali Baskar as Keerthi, Adithya, and Aravind's sister, Manohar's wife
 Bhaskar as Damodharan, Adithya, Aravind, and Keerthi's father 
 Bala Subramani as Rajasekhar, Sanghavi's father 
 Bindhu Pankaj as Latha, Sanghavi's mother
 Deepa as Vasuki, Manohar's mother 
 Ganesh as Boopathi, Manohar's father 
 Barath Guru as Deva, Pavithra's relative
 Geetha Saraswathi as Kamakshi, Deva's mother
 Kathadi Ramamurthy as Sundaram, Pavithra's grandfather
 Sumathi Sri as Maragatham, Pavithra's grandmother

Special Appearance
 Sriranjini as Herself (Aravind and sanghavi's reception) 
 Shruthi Raj as Isai (Aravind and Shanghavi's reception) 
 Gabrella Sellus as Sundari (Aravind and Shanghavi's reception)

Production

Casting
Tamil Selvi's fame  Sandra Babu was selected to portray the lead female role Pavithra. Vicky Roshan was cast in the male lead role as Adithyakumar, marking his first lead role. Damodharan. Kaushik Gabriel makes his television debut as the second male lead role Aravindkumar Damodharan. Deepthi Rajendran was cast in the main lead role as Sanghavi. Besides Kathadi Ramamurthy, Vanaja Bharath Kumar, Deepa, Bindhu Pankaj and Ganesh were cast then.

Soundtrack 
It was written by Pa. Vijay, composed by N. R. Raghunanthan. It was sung by Namitha Babu. The first opening song was unveiled on 2 June 2022 on Sun TV YouTube.

Soundtrack

Dubbed version

References

External links
 

Sun TV original programming
2022 Tamil-language television series debuts
Television shows set in Tamil Nadu
Tamil-language television soap operas
Tamil-language melodrama television series